Islamic School of Irving (ISI) is a prekindergarten through grade 12 Islamic school in Irving, Texas, in the Dallas-Fort Worth area. As of August 2022 it had 775 students. It opened with kindergarten students on October 21, 1996.

Purpose of Islamic Education 
The Islamic School of Irving has served as a stepping stone for Muslim students in the DFW area to cultivate an education while elevating their Muslim identity. The school supplies its students with a curriculum that intertwines their religion and commitment to God with a high-level education that leads generations to spiritual and academic success. The school's priorities lie in providing students with academic excellence within an Islamic environment, adopting leadership and community skills, substantial Islamic morals, Taqwa and Tawhid.

History of ISI 
ISI opened its school doors on October 21, 1996. The first program to be offered was Kindergarten, where six children were enrolled and graduated in July 1997. Two additional grades, first and second, were added during the 1997–1998 school year. In 1997–1998, ISI had nineteen students graduate from different elementary classes. Over the years, the school has elevated its grade programs and now serves pre-kindergarten all the way to twelfth grade. Currently, the school's enrollment has increased to more than 650 students. Years of planning by the Islamic Center of Irving and support from the local DFW community have contributed to establishing a high-quality resource of education for Muslim children from Irving and surrounding cities in DFW.

Tanzeel Academy 
Girls and Boys from ages five and up are able to learn and memorize the Quran. Tanzeel Academy supplies students with a full-time Quran or part-time Quran memorization and learning programs that enhance students' learning and spiritual outcomes. The program allows students to memorize the Quran from cover to cover and recite the surahs fluently. While attending the program, students also study their core subjects and transition between their academic subjects of Math, Science, and English along with their Quran memorization.

Awards and Certifications

Ranked in the Top 5,000 STEM High Schools in the United States of America 

 According to Newsweek and STEM.org, ISI was ranked as one of the best 5,000 STEM high schools around the United States. Thirty thousand high schools across the nation were analyzed over a three-year period, and out of those 30,000 schools, ISI ranked 2268.

References

External links
 Islamic School of Irving

1996 establishments in Texas
Educational institutions established in 1996
Education in Irving, Texas
High schools in Irving, Texas
Islamic schools in Texas
Private K-12 schools in Dallas County, Texas
Islamic organizations established in 1996